The Mariner's Mirror is the quarterly academic journal of the Society for Nautical Research in the United Kingdom. It was established in 1911 and is abstracted and indexed by Scopus. It is published in partnership with Taylor & Francis. The Mariner's Mirror is ranked by the European Reference Index for the Humanities (ERIH) as an INT1 journal (the highest classification), which has internationally recognised scholarly significance with high visibility and influence among researchers in the various research domains in different countries, regularly cited all over the world.

List of editors
(Source)
 1911-12 - L.G. Carr Laughton
 1913-22 - R.C. Anderson
 1923-31 - W.G. Perrin
 1931-32 - R.C. Anderson
 1932-39 - David Bonner-Smith
 1939-46 - R.C. Anderson
 1946-54 - Commander Hilary Poland Mead
 1954-61 - George Worcester
 1961-71 - Captain T. Davys Manning
 1971-79 - Professor Christopher Lloyd
 1979-91 - Brian Dolley
 1991-2000- Michael Duffy, D.Phil.
 2001-05  - Dr. Richard Harding
 2005-13 - Dr. Hugh Murphy
 2013-   - Dr. Martin Bellamy

References

External links 
 
 The Mariner's Mirror archive at HathiTrust

Maritime history journals
Publications established in 1911
Quarterly journals
English-language journals